Justice McFarland may refer to:

Ernest McFarland, chief justice of the Arizona Supreme Court 
Kay McFarland, chief justice of the Kansas Supreme Court
Robert McFarland (judge), associate justice of the Tennessee Supreme Court
Thomas Bard McFarland, associate justice of the Supreme Court of California